Cerro Pajonales is a peak in Chile with an elevation of  metres. Pajonales is within the following mountain ranges: Chilean Andes, Puna de Atacama. It is on the border of 2 provinces: Chilean provinces of El Loa and Antofagasta. Its slopes are within the administrative boundaries of the2 cities: Chilean cities of San Pedro de Atacama and Antofagasta.

First Ascent 
Pajonales was first climbed by José Martínez Hernández, Ricardo Artalejo, Luis Bernardo Durand, Eduardo Ruiz (Spain) in 02/10/1996. During the first ascent by the Spanish, they found a metal bar on the summit, so the first modern ascent of Pajonales is unknown. This is probably by topographers or miners - Research by Guillermo Almaraz.

Elevation 
Other data from available digital elevation models: ASTER filled 5935 metres, ALOS metres, TanDEM-X 5980 metres, The height of the nearest key col is 5497 meters, leading to a topographic prominence of 461 meters. Pajonales is considered a Mountain according to the Dominance System  and its dominance is 7.74%. Its parent peak is Pular and the Topographic isolation is 6.6 kilometers.

References

External links 

 Elevation information about Pajonales
 Weather Forecast at Pajonales

Six-thousanders of the Andes